Roshdy is a Rich neighborhood in Alexandria.

See also
 Neighborhoods in Alexandria

Populated places in Alexandria Governorate
Neighbourhoods of Alexandria